South Channel is a small channel in the United States located in Massachusetts Bay near Boston, Massachusetts. It runs alongside Devils Back and Aldridge Ledge from northeast of Ram Head to the western coast of Commissioners Ledge.

Channels of the United States